Simon Rivera High School is a public high school in Brownsville, Texas (USA). It is one of six high schools operated by the Brownsville Independent School District and classified as a 6A school by the UIL. In 2015, the school was rated "Met Standard" by the Texas Education Agency.

It  opened in 1988 and consisted of two grade levels, ninth and tenth grade. Each year another grade level was added. Its first graduating class was in 1991. The school was named for Simon Rivera Jr., a long-time principal at Brownsville's Central Intermediate School.

Athletics
The Rivera Raiders compete in the following sports:

Baseball
Basketball
Cross Country
Football
Golf
Powerlifting
Soccer
Softball
Swimming and Divingcit
Tennis
Track and Field
Volleyball

Soccer
2015 6A Soccer State Champions

References

External links
 
 BISD history website
 

Education in Brownsville, Texas
Public high schools in Texas
Brownsville Independent School District high schools